A teaching hospital is a hospital or medical centre that provides medical education and training to future and current health professionals. Teaching hospitals are almost always affiliated with one or more universities and are often co-located with medical schools.

Teaching hospitals use a residency program to educate qualified physicians, podiatrists, dentists, and pharmacists who are receiving training after attaining the degree of MD, DPM, DDS, DMD, PharmD, DO, BDS, BDent, MBBS, MBChB, or BMed. Those that attend a teaching hospital or clinic would practice medicine under the direct or indirect supervision of a senior medical clinician registered in that specialty, such as an attending physician or consultant. The purpose of these residency programs is to create an environment where new doctors can learn to practice medicine in a safe setting which is supervised by physicians that provide both oversight and education.

History 
The first teaching hospital where students were authorized to methodically practice on patients under the supervision of physicians, was reportedly the Academy of Gundishapur in the Persian Empire during the Sassanid era. Some of the earliest teaching hospitals were the Islamic Bimaristans, which included the Al-Adudi Hospital founded in Baghdad in 981 and the Al-Fustat Hospital in Cairo founded in 872.

Definitions
The following definitions are commonly used in connection with teaching hospitals:
Medical studentA person enrolled in a medical degree program at a medical school. In the graduate medical education model used in the United States, medical students must first complete an undergraduate degree from a university or college before being accepted to a medical school. In the undergraduate model traditionally used in countries such as the United Kingdom or Australia, medicine is an undergraduate university degree which students directly enter from high school. In more recent years, the graduate model has increasingly been adopted in the UK and Australia as well, without entirely displacing the traditional undergraduate model–both graduate entry and undergraduate entry programs coexist. (Historically, the undergraduate model used to exist in the US as well, but had been abandoned by the mid-19th century.)
Physicians assistant Medical professionals who have completed training at the Masters level. They are trained to practice medicine alongside physicians on a population level allowing them to work in a wide range of specialties. This profession is not traditionally found in most countries outside North America, but in recent years there have been attempts to establish it in some of them, with mixed success. 
InternA person that has a doctorate of medicine from a graduate medical school, or a Bachelor of Medicine/Bachelor of Surgery (in the British undergraduate model), that only practices with guidance and supervision of a physician/consultant.
Residency or post-graduate programIn the US and Canada, individuals that have completed their first year of a medical internship. Residencies may last anywhere from two to seven years, depending on the specialty. In most Commonwealth countries, the role of specialist registrar is roughly equivalent
Specialist registrarIn the British system, a doctor who is receiving advanced training in a medical specialty in a hospital setting; after four to six years as a specialist registrar, the doctor may then undertake a post-training fellowship, before becoming a consultant
Attending physicianIn the US and Canada, an attending physician (also known as an attending, rendering doc, or staff physician) is a physician (M.D. or D.O.) who has completed residency and practices medicine in a clinic or hospital, in the specialty learned during residency. An attending physician typically supervises fellows, residents, medical students, and other practitioners. Attending physicians may also maintain professorships at an affiliated medical school.
ConsultantThis is the equivalent concept to "attending physician" in most Commonwealth countries (except for Canada)
Fellowship (medicine)A period of medical training in the United States and Canada, that a physician, dentist, or veterinarian may undertake after completing a specialty training program (residency). During this time (usually over a year), the physician is known as a fellow. Fellows are capable of acting as an attending physician or a consultant physician in the specialist field in which they were trained. 
 Grand roundsGrand rounds is a methodology of medical education and inpatient care, consisting of presenting the medical problems and treatment of a particular patient to an audience consisting of doctors, pharmacists, residents, and medical students. It was first conceived by clinicians as a way for junior colleagues to round on patients.
 Teaching clinicA teaching clinic is an outpatient clinic that provides health care for ambulatory patients - as opposed to inpatients treated in a hospital. Teaching clinics traditionally are operated by educational facilities and provide free or low-cost services to patients.
Nurse educationSome teaching hospitals partner with nursing education institutions to provide in-hospital, practical education for nurses, both graduate and undergraduate.

Research
Many teaching hospitals and medical centers are known for the medical research that is performed in their hospitals.  Close association with medical colleges and universities enhances the research programs at teaching hospitals.  Some of the more notable teaching hospitals include the following:
Cedars-Sinai Medical Center, Los Angeles, California, United States
Charité - Universitätsmedizin Berlin, Berlin, Germany
Cleveland Clinic, Cleveland, Ohio, United States
Johns Hopkins Hospital, Baltimore,  Maryland, United States
Massachusetts General Hospital, Boston, Massachusetts, United States
Mayo Clinic, Rochester, Minnesota, United States
Ronald Reagan UCLA Medical Center, California, United States
Sheba Medical Center, Ramat Gan, Israel
Singapore General Hospital, Bukit Merah, Singapore
Toronto General Hospital, Toronto, Canada
University of Alberta Hospital, Edmonton, Canada
University Hospital of Zürich, Zurich, Switzerland
NorthShore University Health System, Northbrook, United States

Africa

Algeria

The Algerian Ministry of Health, Population and Hospital Reform maintains 15 public university teaching hospital centres (French: Centre Hospitalo-Universitaire or CHU) with 13,755 beds and one public university hospital (EHU) with 773 beds.

Gambia
Edward Francis Small Teaching Hospital became a teaching hospital in the 1990s, and offers a 6-year MBBS degree.

South Africa
Chris Hani Baragwanath Hospital is a teaching hospital affiliated with the University of the Witwatersrand Medical School, and is the third-largest hospital in the world. Another academic hospital, University of Cape Town's Groote Schuur Hospital, was the site of the first human-to-human heart transplant.

Asia

Pakistan

Aga Khan University Hospital (Aga Khan Hospital and Medical College) is a 721-bed teaching hospital that trains doctors and hospital administrators with support from American and Canadian universities. The hospital also coordinates a network of over 100 health care units primarily in rural or remote areas.

Europe

France

In France, the teaching hospitals are called CHU (Centre hospitalier universitaire). They are regional hospitals with an agreement within a university, or possibly several universities.  A part of the medical staff are both medical practitioners and teachers under the two institutions agreement, and receive dual compensation.

There are at least one per French administrative region. In the city of Paris and its suburbs, it is the local public hospital system called Assistance publique - Hôpitaux de Paris (AP-HP) which has an agreement with the universities of Paris 5, Paris 6, Paris 7, Paris 11, Paris 12 and Paris 13. However, it is divided into small groups of hospitals and universities which are commonly called CHU as if they were separate CHU.

There are 32 teaching hospitals in France.  Amongst these are 30 University hospitals and only two Regional teaching hospitals.

North America

United States

The first teaching hospital in the United States was founded at the College of Philadelphia (now the University of Pennsylvania) in 1765, when medical students at the college began taking bedside instruction at the Pennsylvania Hospital (an institution that predated the medical school by several years). Following that were King's College of New York in 1768, Harvard University in 1783, Dartmouth College in 1798, and Yale University in 1810 to begin the history of notable university-affiliated teaching hospitals in America.

Teaching hospitals rose to prevalence in the United States beginning the early 1900s and they largely resembled those established by Johns Hopkins University, the University of Pennsylvania and the Lakeside Hospital in Cleveland. The hospitals that followed the example of these universities were all very large, technologically sophisticated and aimed to have a global impact through both patient care and scientific research. Additionally, these hospitals had large patient bases, abundant financial resources, and renowned physicians, advisors and staff. Many of the medical schools that ensued the prospect of being associated to a nearby hospital tended to be private institutions that received philanthropic support.

While some funding comes from Medicaid for the GME process, teaching hospitals must consider paying residents and fellows within their budgets. These additional costs vary between hospitals based on funding by Medicaid and their general salary for residents and fellows.  Despite these costs, they are often offset by the prices of procedures which are elevated in comparison to most non-teaching hospitals. Teaching hospitals often justify this additional cost factor by boasting that their quality of care rises above non-teaching hospitals, or ensuring the patient that they are improving medicine of the future by having their procedure done with medical trainees present.

Oceania

Australia 
According to the Medical Journal of Australia, Australian teaching hospitals typically receive less funding for research than they do in similarly-situated countries. The late 1800s and early 1900s saw several attempts at instituting a teaching hospital to be affiliated with a medical school, but plans fell through until 1928, when Royal Prince Alfred Hospital became Australia's first teaching hospital, to educate students of the University of Sydney.

See also
 List of university hospitals
 History of hospitals

References

 
 
 
 

 
Teaching